John Digons (1500/1 – 1585), of Chichester, Sussex, was an English politician.

Digons was Mayor of Chichester for 1548–49, 1556–57 and 1567–68 and elected Member of Parliament for Chichester in November 1554.

He was buried at Chichester Cathedral.

References

1500 births
1585 deaths
Mayors of Chichester
English MPs 1554–1555